Isabel Sánchez de Urdaneta was a Venezuelan stateswoman and feminist in the mid-twentieth century. She was a teacher and founder of kindergartens in Venezuela before she and her husband moved to Washington, D.C., where he took up a diplomatic position. She served as a delegate to the San Francisco Conference when the UN Charter was drafted in 1945. She was the 1946 Venezuelan delegate to the Inter-American Commission of Women as well as the 1947 delegate to the Primer Congreso Interamericano de Mujeres (First Inter-American Congress of Women).

References

Venezuelan feminists
Venezuelan educators
Venezuelan suffragists
Year of death missing